Stackpole may refer to:

Places
Stackpole, an estate in Pembrokeshire, Wales, United Kingdom
Stackpole Estate, a National Trust property in the above community
Stackpole and Castlemartin, a community in Pembrokeshire, Wales, United Kingdom

Persons
H. C. Stackpole III (1935-2020), United States Marines Corps general
Keith Stackpole (born 1940), Australian cricketer
Keith Stackpole (footballer) (born 1916), Australian footballer
Michael A. Stackpole (born 1957), American science fiction and fantasy author
Peter Stackpole (1913-1993), American photographer
Ralph Stackpole (1885-1973), American sculptor

Businesses
Stackpole Books, a book publishing company in Mechanicsburg, Pennsylvania, United States
Stackpole Electronics, a resistor manufacturer is Raleigh, North Carolina, United States